Marion Township is one of eleven townships in Jennings County, Indiana, United States. As of the 2010 census, its population was 1,117 and it contained 457 housing units.

Geography
The streams of Brushy Fork, Crooked Creek, Sixmile Creek and Slate Creek run through this township.

Adjacent townships
 Spencer Township (north)
 Lovett Township (northeast)
 Montgomery Township (east)
 Graham Township, Jefferson County (southeast)
 Jennings Township, Scott County (south)
 Johnson Township, Scott County (south)
 Vernon Township, Jackson County (southwest)
 Washington Township, Jackson County (west)

Cemeteries
The township contains two cemeteries: German and Keith.

Major highways
  Indiana State Road 250

References
 U.S. Board on Geographic Names (GNIS)
 United States Census Bureau cartographic boundary files

External links
 Indiana Township Association
 United Township Association of Indiana

Townships in Jennings County, Indiana
Townships in Indiana